Roisin Willis (born 6 August 2004) is an American track and field athlete. She won gold medals in the 800 meters and the women's 4 × 400 m relay at the 2022 World Under-20 Championships.

Willis is a two-time NCAA champion.

Personal life
Her mother is Irish athlete Breeda Dennehy-Willis, who competed in the 5,000 m and 10,000 m races at the 2000 Sydney Olympics. Roisin attended Stevens Point High School in Wisconsin. After graduation from High School, she chose to attend Stanford University to be coached by Stanford head coach J.J. Clark, in cross country and track and field.

Career
Willis achieved a big amount of success as a high-school athlete. She is the US high-school indoor 800 meters record holder. Her time of 2:00.78 for the distance recorded as a junior is a U.S. under-18 record. She possesses Wisconsin state records in 400 m, 800 m and 1600 m. Willis qualified to run in the 2020 US Olympic trials at Hayward Field in Eugene, Oregon, after running 2:00.78 for the 800 m at the Trials of Miles New York City. In the trials she reached the semi-finals and finished thirteenth.

She won silver in the 800 m at the 2022 USATF U20 Outdoor Championships. Willis broke the championship record when she ran a personal best time of 1:59.13 to win the event at the World Junior Championships held in Cali, Colombia that year. It was the first time she had ran sub-two minutes in a 800 m race. She added gold for the women's 4 x 400 m relay with an official split time of 51.34.

2023–present
Willis won the 800 m in a time of 1:59.93 at the 2023 NCAA Division 1 Indoor T&F Championships in Albuquerque, NM, setting a personal best, meet record and facility record in the process. She was also a member of the Stanford team that won the Distance medley relay in 10:56.34.

Achievements

NCAA titles
 NCAA Division I Women's Indoor Track and Field Championships
 800 meters: 2023
 Distance medley relay: 2023

References

External links
 

 2004 births
Living people
Track and field athletes from Wisconsin
American female middle-distance runners
World Athletics U20 Championships winners
American people of Irish descent